E-Werk is a music venue located in Erlangen, Germany. The venue opened in 1982 and is supported by GmbH. Many notable artists have performed at E-Werk, including Wishbone Ash, Uriah Heep, Blue Öyster Cult, K.Flay and Hawkwind.

References

External links
  

Music venues in Germany